Petermann of Gundoldingen (* 14th century in Lucerne ; † 9. July 1386 ) was Schultheiss (akin to today's office of mayor) of Lucerne and participated in the Battle of Sempach.

Life
Petermann was the son of Werner Gundoldingen. He was in his first marriage with Berchta of garden and later married Agnes von Moos. Werner was probably Gerber and 1352 the largest taxpayers, which means that he was the richest citizens of Lucerne. Succeeding his father was Gundoldingen Lucerne's mayor from 1361 until his resignation by a constitutional amendment in December 1384. Under his Lucerne change was initiated by a country town for Territorial mistress.

1366 Lucerne took the pledge on the stem Vogt control by the heirs of Count Johann von Frohburg what was the basis of the municipal acquisition policy. 1370 Gundoldingen of Grossmünster provost Bruno Brun (son of was Rudolf Brun ) kidnapped, leading to the constitution of the so-called Pfaff Briefs led. 1379 bailiwick was Ebikon Petermann of Gundoldingen and his son transferred as an Austrian fief; the following year he acquired the bailiwick Weggis Lucerne; from 1380 there was Burgrecht grants in later to become Lucerne area ( Sempach ). Gundoldingen worked as a referee for the Swiss cities and Austria. 1384 he was Altschultheiss.

On January 3, 1386 Gundoldingen marched with the Confederates after Wolhusen, where they were received with cheers. They chased the Vogt Peter of Thorberg and destroyed its two castles. 1386 he received the command of the Lucerne troops he led in Sempach against Austria with the Confederates.

According to the legend of Sempach he was killed during the battle. It states: One Lucernian after another fell into the grass. The proud banner of Lucerne tottered and fell. Sixty men lay in their blood. The Lucerne leader Petermann of Gundoldingen fell to the ground dying, and now the threatening spear wall began to move. Petermann was not among the federal role models against Arnold von Winkelried prevail.

The Lucerne Magistrate family is probably named south of Hochdorf to the farm Gundoldingen. The Arnold of Gundelvingen 1312 first testified in Lucerne branch succeeded later than the second generation, a rapid political and economic rise without formal qualification Ritter, whereupon arbitration lines and family ties to the moss, from Büttikon and Garden point. From 1329 were the Gundoldingen vassals of the Monastery Lucerne. carried an Austrian investiture of the bailiwicks Ebikon and Rotsee 1379 ago. Members of both sexes can be detected even in the second half of the 15th century in the region of origin.
Ceremony

An inscription on the east side of the Zurich City Hall says:
PET[er] M[ann] V. GVNTELI SCHVLTH. V. LUCERN. (= Petermann of Gundoldingen Schultheiss of Lucerne) 1386. AVT MORS AVT VITA DECORA. (= Either a life in honor or death)

Literature
Theodor von Liebenau: The Schultheissen of Lucerne. In: The historian friend. Releases of the Historical Society of the five cities of Lucerne, *Uri, Schwyz, Unterwalden and whether nid the forest and train. Volume 35, 1880, pp 55–182
Melchior Estermann: From the history of Gundoldingen. In: The Fatherland. July 3, 1886
Kuno Müller: Petermann of Gundoldingen. In: Inner Swiss Yearbook of History. Tape 8-10, 1944–46, pp 61–74
Roger Sablonier : Central Switzerland and early Confederation. 1990 60

References

Sources
Gregor Egloff: Gundoldingen, Petermann of the Historical Dictionary of Switzerland

1386 deaths
14th-century Swiss people